Teymuraz Gabashvili was the defending champion but chose not to participate.

Marko Tepavac won the title after defeating Dudi Sela 2–6, 6–3, 7–6(7–4) in the final.

Seeds

Draw

Finals

Top half

Bottom half

References
Main Draw
Qualifying Draw

Karshi Challenger - Singles